The 1959–60 Egyptian Premier League, was the 10th season of the Egyptian Premier League, the top Egyptian professional league for association football clubs, since its establishment in 1948. The season started on 11 September 1959 and concluded on 17 June 1960.
Zamalek managed to win the league for the first time.

League table 

 (C)= Champions, (R)= Relegated, Pld = Matches played; W = Matches won; D = Matches drawn; L = Matches lost; F = Goals for; A = Goals against; ± = Goal difference; Pts = Points.

Top goalscorers

Teams

References

External links 
 All Egyptian Competitions Info

5
1959–60 in African association football leagues
1959–60 in Egyptian football